Elm Hill is a historic home located near Baskerville, Mecklenburg County, Virginia. It was built about 1800, and is a frame dwelling and consists of a central two-story, three-bay block flanked by one-story, one-bay wings, and backed by a two-story, two-bay ell.  It is set on rubble stone underpinnings, and features massive sandstone chimneys at either end of the main block.  Also on the property are a contributing pair of smokehouses.

It was listed on the National Register of Historic Places in 1979.

References

Houses on the National Register of Historic Places in Virginia
Houses completed in 1800
Houses in Mecklenburg County, Virginia
National Register of Historic Places in Mecklenburg County, Virginia
1800 establishments in Virginia